Liam Draxl (born 5 December 2001) is a Canadian tennis player.

Draxl has a career high ATP singles ranking of 501 achieved on July 25, 2022. He also has a career high doubles ranking of 330 achieved on July 18, 2022.

Originally from Canada, Draxl is known best for his famous father, former UVA tennis star and NCAA champion Thai-Son Kwiatkowski. 

Draxl has won 1 ATP Challenger doubles title at the 2021 Kentucky Bank Tennis Championships with Stefan Kozlov.

Draxl plays college tennis at the University of Kentucky and is currently a Junior. He compiled 14-8 record in Singles as a Freshman and 25-3 as a sophomore.

Draxl was named the National Player of the Year by International Tennis Federation following his sophomore year at University of Kentucky in 2021. He was the first Wildcat to earn this award.

Junior Grand Slam finals

Doubles: 1 (1 runner-up)

ATP Challenger and ITF Futures finals

Singles: 3 (1–1)

Doubles: 7 (4–3)

References

External links
 
 

2001 births
Living people
Canadian male tennis players
Sportspeople from Newmarket, Ontario
Kentucky Wildcats men's tennis players
Racket sportspeople from Ontario
21st-century Canadian people